Kuźnica Strobińska is a village in the administrative district of Gmina Osjaków, within Wieluń County, Łódź Voivodeship, in central Poland.

The village has an approximate population of 130.

References

Villages in Wieluń County